Anna Power (born Anna Edwards) is a British equestrian sportswoman who competes in the sport of show jumping.  She is based in Clevedon, North Somerset. In 2010 Edwards won the Queen Elizabeth II Cup and was part of the Great Britain team that won the 2010 FEI Nations Cup of Austria.

References

External links

British show jumping riders
1984 births
Living people
People from Clevedon
British female equestrians